Tortilia parathicta is a species of moth in the Stathmopodidae family. It is found in India.

References

Stathmopodidae